The Nostocaceae are a family of cyanobacteria that forms filament-shaped colonies enclosed in mucus or a gelatinous sheath.  Some genera in this family are found primarily in fresh water (such as Nostoc), while others are found primarily in salt water (such as Nodularia).  Other genera (e.g. Anabaena) may be found in both fresh and salt water. Most benthic algae of the order Nostocales belong to this family.

Like other cyanobacteria, these bacteria sometimes contain photosynthetic pigments in their cytoplasm to perform photosynthesis.  The particular pigments they contain gives the cells a bluish-green color.

Species of the Nostocaceae are particularly known for their nitrogen-fixing abilities, and they form symbiotic relationships with certain plants, such as the mosquito fern, cycads, and hornworts. The cyanobacteria provide nitrogen to their hosts. Certain species of Anabaena have been used on rice paddy fields.  Mosquito ferns carrying the cyanobacteria grow on the water in the fields during the growing season.  They and the nitrogen they contain are then plowed into the soil following the harvest, which has proved to be an effective natural fertilizer.

The family Nostocaceae belongs to the order Nostocales. Members of the family can be distinguished from those in other families by their unbranched filaments of cells arranged end-to-end, and  development of heterocysts among the cells of the filaments.

References

Further reading 
 Bold, Harold C., Alexopoulos, Constantine J., & Delevoryas, Theodore. (1987). Morphology of Plants and Fungi (5th ed.). New York: Harper & Row. .
 Drouet, Francis. (1973). Revision of the Nostocaceae with Cylindrical Trichomes (formerly Scytonemataceae and Rivulariaceae). New York: Hafner Press. 
 Drouet, Francis. (1981). Revision of the Stigonemataceae with a Summary of the Classification of the Blue-green Algae. Vaduz: J. Cramer. Nova Hedwigia: Heft 66.

External links 
 Microscopy U
 Great Lakes Waterlife Photo Gallery

 
Cyanobacteria families